The 1997 Cariaco earthquake occurred on July 9 at  with a moment magnitude of 6.9 and a maximum Mercalli intensity of VIII (Severe). With its epicenter near Cariaco, Venezuela, at least 81 people were killed and over 500 were injured. Disruption of power, telephone, and water services was reported. This earthquake was felt in much of northeastern Venezuela and could also be felt in Trinidad and Tobago. This earthquake was on the strike-slip El Pilar Fault.

See also
 List of earthquakes in Venezuela

References

Further reading

External links

1997 earthquakes
1997 in Venezuela
Earthquakes in Venezuela
Carúpano
July 1997 events in South America
Sucre (state)
1997 disasters in Venezuela